The 2011 Henrico County Commonwealth's Attorney election was held on November 8, 2015, to elect the Commonwealth's Attorney of Henrico County, Virginia, concurrently with elections to the Senate of Virginia and Virginia House of Delegates. Incumbent Republican Commonwealth's Attorney Wade A. Kizer announced that he would be retiring from the position, making it an open contest. Republicans Matthew Geary and Bill Janis and Democrat Shannon Taylor all ran for Attorney, with Taylor beating both in the general election.

Background  
Republican attorney Wade A. Kizer, who had been in office since 2000, announced his candidacy for the next term in 2009, while attorney Matthew Geary went against him for the Republican primary. Geary won an against Kizer in the Republican primary, with many Republicans against the endorsement. In 2010, Kizer announced that he would not be running for another term and that he would retire from the office. On August 11, 2011, the same day as the 5.8 earthquake in Virginia, attorney Shannon Taylor announced her candidacy for the Commonwealth's Attorney. Days after, Republican Bill Janis entered the race as an Independent politician, dropping his bid for another term for the Virginia House of Delegates.

The Republican Party of Virginia started questioning Geary's leadership because of having an extramarital affair with another woman in the recent years, with Geary admitting to the affairs but saying that he had ended them. Even with Geary admitting his affairs, the Republican Party of Virginia withdrew their endorsement of Geary and to endorse Janis instead. The Henrico County Executive Committee called Geary "an angry and volatile candidate," with one of his consultants, Amanda Chase, leaving the campaign.

Republican primary

Declared 
Matthew Geary, prosecutor and former Chief Deputy Commonwealth’s Attorney for Richmond (2006–2009)

Withdrew 
Wade A. Kizer, incumbent Commonwealth's Attorney

Endorsements

Democratic primary 
Shannon Taylor, attorney

Endorsements

Other parties 
Bill Janis, member of the Virginia House of Delegates (2002–2012)

Endorsements

Results 
Taylor won the election with 45.85% of the total vote, with Janis coming second with 38.02% and Geary at last with 15.97%. Her win made her the first woman to become the Commonwealth's Attorney, with it also being the first time a Democrat had been in power since 1987. Some attributed her win as a result of Geary and Janis splitting the Republican vote.

In 2012, Janis was offered a job by governor Bob McDonnell in the Department of Veterans Services after weeks of speculation after his loss.

References 

H